The lateral recess is a projection of the fourth ventricle which extends into, or rather below, the inferior cerebellar peduncle of the brainstem.

The lateral aperture (Foramen of Luschka), an opening in each extremity of the lateral recess, provides a pathway for cerebrospinal fluid to flow from the brain's ventricular system into the subarachnoid space. The lateral aperture is the end point (and opening or foramen) of the lateral recess. Consider the lateral recess as a tunnel whose opening at one end is the lateral aperture.

In the area of the lateral recess, the vestibular area (containing the vestibular nuclei) and the cochlear nuclei may be found. In the vicinity, the medullary striae may also be seen.

References

Ventricular system